Dolna Verenitsa is a village in Montana Municipality, Montana Province, western Bulgaria.

References

Villages in Montana Province